Horsman is a surname. Notable people with the surname include:

Bill Horsman (footballer) (1906–1982), English football player
Bill Horsman (canoeist), British slalom canoeist
Chris Horsman (born 1978), Welsh rugby union player
Duane Horsman (1937–1991), American boxer
Edward Horsman (1807–1876), British politician, Chief Secretary to Ireland
Fred Horsman (1889–1959), English football player
Greg Horsman, Australian dancer
Jim Horsman (born 1935), Canadian politician
John Whitmore Horsman (1888–1976), Canadian farmer and politician
Kathleen Horsman (1911–1999), British artist
Stephen Horsman, Canadian politician
Thomas Horsman (c.1536–1610), English politician
Vince Horsman (born 1967), Canadian baseball pitcher and coach